Sergei Shiliaev (born 15 August 1984) is a Belarusian former competitive figure skater. He qualified for the free skate at two ISU Championships – 2003 Junior Worlds, where he finished 16th, and 2003 Europeans, where he finished 24th.

Programs

Results

References

External links
 

Belarusian male single skaters
1984 births
Living people
Sportspeople from Kirov, Kirov Oblast
20th-century Belarusian people
21st-century Belarusian people